This is a list of seasons completed by the USC Trojans football team since its conception in 1888.

Seasons

Notes

References

USC Trojans

USC Trojans football seasons